Wadi Al Banat is a district in Qatar, geographically located in the municipality of Al Daayen but also a census-designated district of Ad-Dawhah. It is situated near the borders with Doha Municipality and Umm Salal Municipality.

Etymology
Wadi Al Banat's name means "valley of the girls" in Arabic, and was thought to have been named that because it was a popular play area for young girls.

Infrastructure
Qatar Fuel (WOQOD) opened a vehicle inspection center in Wadi Al Banat in December 2014 at a cost of QAR 23 million. It occupies an area of 7,500 sq meters and its facilities include a security office, parking area, and customer lounge.

Education
The Doha Institute for Graduate Studies is located on Al Tarfa Street in Wadi Al Banat.

References

Populated places in Al Daayen